This article lists diplomatic missions resident in Bosnia and Herzegovina.  At present, the capital city of Sarajevo hosts 45 embassies. Several other countries have non-resident embassies accredited from other regional capitals, such as Vienna and Budapest, for diplomatic and consular purposes.

Embassies in Sarajevo

Missions in Sarajevo

Embassy Branch Offices in other parts of Bosnia and Herzegovina

Consular missions in Bosnia and Herzegovina

Non-resident embassies accredited to Bosnia and Herzegovina 
Resident in Budapest unless otherwise noted.

 (Zagreb)

 (Vienna)
 (Belgrade)
 (Moscow)
 (The Hague)
 (Belgrade)
 (Vienna)
 (Ankara)
 (Rome)

 (Belgrade)

 (Rome)
 (Zagreb)
 (Ankara)
 (Ankara)
 (Vienna)

 (Belgrade)
 (Ljubljana)
 (Tirana)
 (Rome)
 (Sofia)
 (Zagreb)
 (The Hague)
 (Budapest)
 (Athens)
(Belgrade)

 (Luxembourg)
 (Rome)
 (Rome)
 (Valletta)
 (Belgrade)

 (Zagreb)
 (Rome)

 (Rome)

 (Belgrade)
 (Athens)
 (Vienna)
 (Rome)
 (Belgrade)
 (Rome)

 (Zagreb)
 (Podgorica)
 (Warsaw)
 (Berlin)

 (Paris)

Closed missions

See also
 Foreign relations of Bosnia and Herzegovina
 List of diplomatic missions of Bosnia and Herzegovina
 Visa requirements for Bosnia and Herzegovina citizens

References

External links 
 Embassies in Bosnia-Herzegovina

List
Bosnia and Herzegovina
Diplomatic missions